The 46th Saturn Awards, presented by the Academy of Science Fiction, Fantasy and Horror Films, and honoring the best in science fiction, fantasy, horror, and other genres belonging to genre fiction in film, television, home media releases, and live stage productions, were held October 26, 2021 at the L.A. Marriott Burbank Hotel. Nominations were announced on March 4, 2021. Bruce Campbell hosted the event.

Star Wars: The Rise of Skywalker scored the most film nominations overall with twelve, including Best Science Fiction Film Release. It is one of several films from the previous year's film awards season that was eligible after the group extended its eligibility period to run July 15, 2019 – November 15, 2020, and allowed streaming and VOD titles to qualify for the film categories. The Star Wars franchise ended up winning seven awards thanks to Star Wars: The Rise of Skywalker, the animated series Star Wars: The Clone Wars and the live-action series The Mandalorian. The Star Trek franchise earned the most awards in the television categories, thanks to the three awards won by Star Trek: Discovery and Star Trek: Picard.

Winners and nominees

Film

Television
{| class=wikitable
|-
! style="background:#EEDD82; width:50%" | Best Superhero Adaptation Television Series
! style="background:#EEDD82; width:50%" | Best Science Fiction Television Series
|-
| valign="top" |
 The Boys (Amazon Prime Video) Batwoman (The CW)
 The Flash (The CW)
 Stargirl (DC Universe)
 Supergirl (The CW)
 The Umbrella Academy (Netflix)
 Watchmen (HBO)
| valign="top" |
 Star Trek: Discovery (CBS All Access) Doctor Who (BBC America)
 Lost in Space (Netflix)
 Pandora (The CW)
 Raised by Wolves (HBO Max)
 Star Trek: Picard (CBS All Access)
 Westworld (HBO)
|-
! style="background:#EEDD82; width:50%" | Best Fantasy Television Series
! style="background:#EEDD82; width:50%" | Best Horror Television Series
|-
| valign="top" |
 For All Mankind (Apple TV+) The Dark Crystal: Age of Resistance (Netflix)
 Locke & Key (Netflix)
 The Magicians (Syfy)
 Outlander (Starz)
 The Twilight Zone (CBS All Access)
 The Witcher (Netflix)
| valign="top" |
 The Walking Dead (AMC) Creepshow (Shudder)
 Evil (CBS)
 Fear the Walking Dead (AMC)
 Lovecraft Country (HBO)
 Servant (Apple TV+)
 What We Do in the Shadows (FX)
|-
! style="background:#EEDD82; width:50%" | Best Action / Thriller Television Series
! style="background:#EEDD82; width:50%" | Best Animated Series on Television
|-
| valign="top" |
 Better Call Saul (AMC) Castle Rock (Hulu)
 Jack Ryan (Amazon Prime Video)
 The Outpost (The CW)
 Pennyworth (Epix)
 Riverdale (The CW)
 Snowpiercer (TNT)
| valign="top" |
 Star Wars: The Clone Wars (Disney+) BoJack Horseman (Netflix)
 Family Guy (Fox)
 Primal (Adult Swim)
 Rick and Morty (Adult Swim)
 The Simpsons (Fox)
|-
! style="background:#EEDD82; width:50%" | Best Television Presentation (under 10 Episodes)
! style="background:#EEDD82; width:50%" | Best Film Presentation in Streaming Media
|-
| valign="top" |
 The Mandalorian (Disney+) Amazing Stories (Apple TV+)
 Dracula (Netflix)
 The Haunting of Bly Manor (Netflix)
 His Dark Materials (HBO)
 Perry Mason (HBO)
| valign="top" |
 Enola Holmes (Netflix) Extraction (Netflix)
 Shirley (Hulu)
 The Vast of Night (Amazon Prime Video)
|-
! style="background:#EEDD82; width:50%" | Best Actor on Television
! style="background:#EEDD82; width:50%" | Best Actress on Television
|-
| valign="top" |
 Patrick Stewart as Jean-Luc Picard on Star Trek: Picard (CBS All Access) Henry Cavill as Geralt of Rivia on The Witcher (Netflix)
 Mike Colter as David Acosta on Evil (CBS)
 Grant Gustin as Barry Allen / The Flash on The Flash (The CW)
 Sam Heughan as Jamie Fraser on Outlander (Starz)
 Jonathan Majors as Atticus "Tic" Freeman on Lovecraft Country (HBO)
 Bob Odenkirk as Jimmy McGill / Saul Goodman on Better Call Saul (AMC)
| valign="top" |
 Caitríona Balfe as Claire Fraser on Outlander (Starz) Melissa Benoist as Kara Danvers / Supergirl on Supergirl (The CW)
 Regina King as Angela Abar / Sister Night on Watchmen (HBO)
 Sonequa Martin-Green as Michael Burnham on Star Trek: Discovery (CBS All Access)
 Thandiwe Newton as Maeve Millay on Westworld (HBO)
 Candice Patton as Iris West on The Flash (The CW)
 Rhea Seehorn as Kim Wexler on Better Call Saul (AMC)
|-
! style="background:#EEDD82; width:50%" | Best Supporting Actor on Television
! style="background:#EEDD82; width:50%" | Best Supporting Actress on Television
|-
| valign="top" |
 Doug Jones as Saru on Star Trek: Discovery (CBS All Access) Jonathan Banks as Mike Ehrmantraut on Better Call Saul (AMC)
 Tony Dalton as Lalo Salamanca on Better Call Saul (AMC)
 Michael Emerson as Dr. Leland Townsend on Evil (CBS)
 Richard Rankin as Roger Wakefield on Outlander (Starz)
 Norman Reedus as Daryl Dixon on The Walking Dead (AMC)
 Luke Wilson as Pat Dugan / S.T.R.I.P.E. on Stargirl (DC Universe)
| valign="top" |
 Danielle Panabaker as Caitlin Snow / Frost on The Flash (The CW) Natasia Demetriou as Nadja on What We Do in the Shadows (FX)
 Cynthia Erivo as Holly Gibney on The Outsider (HBO)
 Melissa McBride as Carol Peletier on The Walking Dead (AMC)
 Colby Minifie as Virginia on Fear the Walking Dead (AMC)
 Sophie Skelton as Brianna "Bree" Randall on Outlander (Starz)
 Tessa Thompson as Charlotte Hale on Westworld (HBO)
|-
! style="background:#EEDD82; width:50%" | Best Performance by a Younger Actor on a Television Series
! style="background:#EEDD82; width:50%" | Best Guest Performance on a Television Series
|-
| valign="top" |
 Brec Bassinger as Courtney Whitmore / Stargirl on Stargirl (DC Universe) Freya Allan as Ciri on The Witcher (Netflix)
 Isa Briones as Dahj / Soji / Sutra on Star Trek: Picard (CBS All Access)
 Maxwell Jenkins as Will Robinson on Lost in Space (Netflix)
 Madison Lintz as Madeline "Maddie" Bosch on Bosch (Amazon Prime Video)
 Cassady McClincy as Lydia on The Walking Dead (AMC)
 Erin Moriarty as Starlight / Annie January on The Boys (Amazon Prime Video)
| valign="top" |
 Jon Cryer as Lex Luthor on Supergirl (The CW) Giancarlo Esposito as Moff Gideon on The Mandalorian (Disney+)
 Mark Hamill as Jim the Vampire on What We Do in the Shadows (FX)
 Jeffrey Dean Morgan as Negan on The Walking Dead (AMC)
 Kate Mulgrew as Alma Lane on Mr. Mercedes (Audience)
 Billy Porter as Keith on The Twilight Zone (CBS All Access)
 Jeri Ryan as Seven of Nine on Star Trek: Picard (CBS All Access)
|}

Home Entertainment
{| class=wikitable
|-
! style="background:#EEDD82; width:50%" | Best 4K Film Release
! style="background:#EEDD82; width:50%" | Best DVD / BD Classic Film Release
|-
| valign="top" |
 Knives Out
 The Alfred Hitchcock Classics Collection
 Apocalypse Now: Final Cut (40th Anniversary Edition)
 Flash Gordon (Limited Edition)
 Jaws (45th Anniversary)
 Mad Max
 The Shining
 War of the Worlds
| valign="top" |
 Dr. Cyclops (Special Edition)
 4D Man (Special Edition)
 The Day the Earth Caught Fire (Special Edition)
 Hercules in the Haunted World (Special Edition)
 The Magic Sword (Special Edition)
 RoboCop (Director's Cut)
 The War of the Worlds (The Criterion Collection)
|-
! style="background:#EEDD82; width:50%" | Best DVD / BD Collection
! style="background:#EEDD82; width:50%" | Best DVD / BD Television Movie or Series Release
|-
| valign="top" |
 Godzilla: The Showa-Era Films, 1954–1975 (The Criterion Collection) Abbott & Costello: The Complete Universal Pictures Collection (80th Anniversary Blu-ray Edition)
 The Fly Collection (The Fly (1958), Return of the Fly, Curse of the Fly, The Fly (1986), and The Fly II)
 Gamera: The Complete Collection
 Hitchcock: British International Pictures Collection
 Laurel & Hardy: The Definitive Restorations
 Three Fantastic Journeys by Karel Zeman (The Criterion Collection) (Journey to the Beginning of Time, Invention for Destruction, and The Fabulous Baron Munchausen)
| valign="top" |
 Creepshow'' (Season One)
 Buck Rogers in the 25th Century (The Complete Collection)
 The Librarians (The Complete Series)
 Mission: Impossible (The Original TV Series)
 The Outsider (The First Season)
 Shazam! (The Complete Live Action Series)
 The Simpsons (The Nineteenth Season)
|}

Live Stage Production

Special Awards
 Visionary Award – Mike Flanagan
 Life Career Award – Michael Gruskoff
 Dan Curtis Legacy Award – Eric Wallace
 Producers Showcase Award – Victoria Alonso
 Special Achievement Award – David Kirschner
 Television Spotlight Award – The Expanse''
 Robert Forster Artist's Award – Christopher Lloyd

Multiple nominations

Multiple wins

References

Saturn Awards ceremonies
2019 film awards
2020 film awards
2019 television awards
2020 television awards
2021 in California
2019 in American cinema
2020 in American cinema
2021 awards in the United States